John Hutchinson was born in 1811 in a village near Newcastle upon Tyne. In 1834, he went to London and received medical training at University College.

Hutchinson invented the spirometer, a device for measuring lung capacity, which he used while evaluating candidates for life insurance as a physician for Brittania Life. He also theorized that air pollution could lead to poor health. Particularly, he researched the safety of coal mining and the presence of charcoal in miner's lungs.

He moved to Australia around 1852, then later to Fiji, where he died after contracting dysentery.

References

1811 births
1861 deaths
British surgeons
British inventors